A wonju (Dzongkha: འོན་འཇུ་; Wylie: 'on-'ju) is a long-sleeved blouse worn by women in Bhutan. Made of silk, polyester, or lightweight cotton, it is worn underneath the kira, part of the national costume under the driglam namzha.

See also
Kira
Toego
Driglam namzha

References

Folk costumes
Bhutanese clothing